Varvara Gracheva was the defending champion but chose not to participate.

Nadia Podoroska won the title, defeating Cristina Bucșa in the final, 4–6, 7–5, 6–2.

Seeds

Draw

Finals

Top half

Bottom half

References

External Links
Main Draw

L'Open 35 de Saint-Malo - Singles
2020 Singles